The 1290s was a decade of the Julian Calendar which began on January 1, 1290, and ended on December 31, 1299.

Significant people

References